The Last Starfighter: Tunnel Chase is a 1984 board game published by FASA.

Gameplay
The Last Starfighter: Tunnel Chase is a game in which space fighters chase one other in the tunnels inside an asteroid.

Reception
Craig Sheeley reviewed The Last Starfighter: Tunnel Chase in Space Gamer No. 71. Sheeley commented that "Hurrah for the newest entry into minigames, The Last Starfighter: Tunnel Chase!  Another triumph for FASA."

References

Board games introduced in 1984
FASA games